Fernán Caballero is a municipality in Ciudad Real, Castile-La Mancha, Spain. The municipality has 103.96 km2 and had a population of 1,093 inhabitants, according to the 2013 census (INE).

References

External links
Website of Fernán Caballero

Municipalities in the Province of Ciudad Real